Saad al Obaidi Ghaffoori (born 1973) is a Sunni Awakening leader from Ameriyah in Baghdad.

Early life
Sa'ad was born in Baghdad in 1973 and worked as a military officer.

Iraq War

Following the 2003 invasion of Iraq, Abu Abed turned against al-Qaeda due to the often indiscriminate use of violence used by the terrorists, as well as the fact that Al-Qaeda terrorized Sunni citizens. Abu Abed was extremely good at routing out terrorists and al-Qaeda members from their strongholds. The U.S. Army began to employ his services, from the Knights of the Two Rivers (Forsain al Rafadain) which included thousands of Sons of Iraq and Sahwa loyalists, in order to counter the terrorist organizations operating in Baghdad. His courage earned the respect and accolades of American soldiers.

His rapidly growing popularity on both the Sunni and the Shi'ia street was perceived as a political threat to the predominantly-Shi'ia government in Baghdad, as well as entrenched Sunni politicians. Once al-Qaeda was no longer deemed a threat to the Maliki government, Abu Abed was forced into exile. Abu Abed is wanted by the Maliki government as well as al-Qaeda/ISIS operatives.

See also
Al-Qaeda in Iraq
Sons of Iraq

References

1973 births
Iraqi Sunni Muslims
Living people
People from Baghdad